The 2019–20 season was Inter Milan's 111th in existence and 104th consecutive season in the top flight of Italian football. The side competed in Serie A, the Coppa Italia, the UEFA Champions League and the UEFA Europa League.

Kits

Season overview

On 26 May 2019, Inter beat Empoli 2–1 at San Siro in the final round of the 2018–19 Serie A season, which confirmed qualification for the UEFA Champions League group stage. On 30 May 2019, Inter dismissed Luciano Spalletti from his position as head coach. On 31 May 2019, Inter appointed Antonio Conte as their new manager on a three-year contract.

Players

Squad information

Note: Serie A imposes a cap on the first team squad at 25 players, with additional requirements on homegrown players (marked as HG) and club-trained players (marked as CT). However, league rules allow for unlimited club-trained players that are under-21 (marked as U21).

Transfers

In

Transfers

On loan

Loan returns

Out

Transfers

Loans out

Loans ended

Pre-season and friendlies

Casinò Lugano Cup

International Champions Cup

International Super Cup

Friendlies

Trofeo Naranja

Competitions

Overview

Serie A

League table

Results summary

Results by round

Matches

Coppa Italia

UEFA Champions League

Group stage

UEFA Europa League

Knockout phase

Statistics

Appearances and goals

|-
! colspan=14 style="background:#dcdcdc; text-align:center| Goalkeepers

|-
! colspan=14 style="background:#dcdcdc; text-align:center| Defenders

|-
! colspan=14 style="background:#dcdcdc; text-align:center| Midfielders

|-
! colspan=14 style="background:#dcdcdc; text-align:center| Forwards

|-
! colspan=14 style="background:#dcdcdc; text-align:center| Players transferred out during the season

Goalscorers

Last updated: 21 August 2020

Clean sheets

Last updated: 21 August 2020

Disciplinary record

Last updated: 21 August 2020

Attendances

Last updated: 28 July 2020

References

Inter Milan seasons
Inter Milan
Inter Milan